Adoption Covenant is a 501(c)(3) charitable organization formed in 2003 in Lubbock, Texas by Merinda K. Condra. It became a licensed child placing agency in 2004. In 2012, Adoption Covenant was nominated by Randy Neugebauer for special recognition, and as a result of this received the Congressional Coalition on Adoption Institute's 2012 Congressional Angel in Adoption Award.  At that time, it was reported that Adoption Covenant had been involved in helping over 300 children find their forever homes.

References

Adoption-related organizations
Adoption history
Adoption workers
Adoption in the United States
History of Lubbock, Texas
Organizations established in 2003